Jacques-Anthony, sometimes known by the stage name DXN BNLVDN, is a Russian rapper and songwriter from St. Petersburg. He has done collaborations with many popular artists including Oxxxymiron and Smokey Mo, and some of his works have been featured in movies, such as his release of "Our District", which was featured in the movie "Attraction". He has currently released six albums and over seventy-six songs.

Early life
Jacques was born on 21 January 1993, in Vologda, Russia to Simona Makanda and rapper Ligalize. Jacques's mother was the lead singer of a popular hip-hop group known as the D.O.B. Community and the first female rapper in Russia, and his father was a famous rapper known as Legalize and the founder of the DOB Community. Andrew married Simon four years after Jacques's birth, and the three then moved to the Congo where they lived for a few years before returning to Russia at the outbreak of the Congo Civil War.
Jacques then lived with his father in Medvedkovo until his mother reunited with him at the age of 11. Initially, Jacques attended Kazarnovskii, which is a school in Moscow. It was during this time that Jacques began learning to play the piano and guitar.

In 2004, Jacques moved with his mother to the city of St. Petersburg, and his parents divorced soon afterward. In an interview, Jacques stated that at the new school he was involved with karate, alcohol, and hashish. With nowhere left to turn but his music, Jacques began writing his own raps at the age of 14.

In 2008, Jacques moved back to Africa with his mother. He got in trouble with the law though, so he was sent to live with his Aunt and Uncle elsewhere in Africa. His uncle, the CEO of an oil company, made sure that Jacques was once again attending an elite school. He soon left to study Political Science at a university in Moscow. Jacques quickly lost interest in his studies though, and he decided to join the Army. He then served in Ivanovo as a Strategic Missile Forces Specialist, until he retired at the rank of Corporal.

Music career
At the start of his career, Jack used many pseudonyms, the most notable being Don Binladen, but he has since changed his name to Jacques Anthony. He then joined a record label “Reigun Records”, and released some small works, but none of them got much popularity. His first breakthrough was in December 2014 with an internet video titled “Old Testament”. This gained him quite a bit of attention in the rap scene. In September 2015, Jack's career exploded with his release of  “Breathless”, which featured popular rapper Oxxxymiron. In 2015 alone, Jack released multiple singles and two albums: #NoName and The Same Negro. He also did a collaboration in December 2015, “Director”, with Smokey Mo. Jack was nominated for “Breakthrough of the Year” in 2015 by the Public NR.

In 2016, Jack released Breathless and Dorian Gray, which included a number of hit tracks such as “Fallen”, “I Read With My Eyes Closed”, and “Tic Tac Toe”. He also released multiple singles including "Saturn" and "Like a Shark".

So far, the only single Jacques has released in 2017 has been "In Black and White".

Song List

References

1993 births
Living people
Russian rappers
Russian hip hop musicians
People from Vologda
Russian male songwriters